The Sandhurst Football Netball Club, nicknamed the Dragons, is an Australian rules football and netball club based in Bendigo, Victoria. Sandhurst is the former name of that city.

The club teams currently compete in the Bendigo Football Netball League. The football team is the second most-winning team of the BFL, with 27 premierships.

History
Sandhurst, who were then known as the Maroons, were one of the league's foundation clubs in 1880. They had been formed in June 1861, by Melbourne Football Club rulemaker J. B. Thompson.

The club did not play in the BFL from 1901 to 1914, but returned to the league after the war in 1919, and have appeared in every season since.

They are the second most successful club in BFL history with 27 premierships, one behind Eaglehawk.

Premierships
 Bendigo Football League (27): 1881, 1884, 1885, 1890, 1891, 1893, 1920, 1923, 1927, 1929, 1930, 1931, 1932, 1933, 1934, 1937, 1940, 1947, 1948, 1949, 1973, 1977, 1978, 1981, 1983, 2004, 2016

Notable former players

Football
Graham Arthur (Hawthorn premiership captain)
Brendan Edwards (Hawthorn Team of the Century member)
Trevor Keogh (Carlton premiership player)
Adam Selwood (former West Coast Eagles premiership player)
Joel Selwood (Geelong Cats captain and three-time premiership player)
Scott Selwood (former West Coast Eagles and Geelong Cats player)
Troy Selwood (former Brisbane Lions player)

Geoff Southby (Carlton Team of the Century member)
Fred Swift (Richmond premiership captain)
Mark Robinson (Herald Sun journalist)
Flynn Perez (current  player)

Frank Coghlan St Kilda

Mick Sexton Carlton

Netball
Internationals

 Rebecca Bulley

References

External links

 Twitter page
 Facebook page

Sports clubs established in 1861
Australian rules football clubs established in 1861
Bendigo Football League clubs
1861 establishments in Australia
Netball teams in Victoria (Australia)